The Cariri climbing mouse (Rhipidomys cariri) is a partly arboreal rodent species from South America. It is known from two mesic localities in Ceara, northeastern Brazil, within the semiarid caatinga ecoregion. It has been found in areas under cultivation. Cariri is the name of an administrative microregion within the state of Ceará.

References

Mammals of Brazil
Rhipidomys
Mammals described in 2005